The Stadium Milenium or Speedway Stadion Milenium is a 7,500-capacity multi-use stadium between Donji Kraljevec and Goričan, Croatia. The stadium has been used as the venue for the World Championship round known as the Speedway Grand Prix of Croatia from 2010 to 2012 and since 2022. 

The stadium construction is credited to Yugoslav champion rider Zvonimir Pavlić and the speedway track has a circumference of 305 metres.

See also 
Speedway Grand Prix of Croatia

References

Sport in Croatia
Speedway in Croatia
Speedway venues in Croatia